John Paul Henson (April 25, 1965 – February 14, 2014) was an American puppeteer, best known for his association with The Muppets.

Early years
Henson was the son of puppeteer Jim Henson (1936–1990), best known as the creator of The Muppets, and Jane Henson (1934–2013), who assisted in the launch of the Muppets. He had four siblings: Lisa (born 1960), Cheryl (born 1961), Brian (born 1963), and Heather (born 1970).

Career 
John performed Muppet character Sweetums starting in 1992 following the death of Richard Hunt (who trained John Henson in performing Sweetums). The role has since been passed to different puppeteers, including David Rudman, Noel MacNeal, Rob Mills and Matt Vogel. Vogel officially assumed the role in 2009.

In addition to his work with the Jim Henson Company, John produced independent films, worked as a production designer, animator, writer, wood worker, artist and builder. Zelda Catwoman of Queens, a short film he co-wrote and produced with long time collaborator and childhood friend filmmaker Alex Halpern, won the student Academy Award in the experimental division, just prior to his father's death in 1990.

Death 
On February 14, 2014, at the age  of 48, Henson died at his home in Saugerties, New York, from a heart attack. His family had a private funeral for him. He was cremated and his ashes were given to his family.

Filmography

Television

Film

Video games

Miscellaneous

References

External links 
 

1965 births
2014 deaths
Henson family (show business)
Jim Henson
Muppet performers
People from Greenwich, Connecticut
People from Saugerties, New York